The Duchy of Courland and Semigallia was the name for a proposed client state of the German Empire during World War I which did not come into existence. It was proclaimed on 8 March 1918, in the German-occupied Courland Governorate by a council composed of Baltic Germans, who offered the crown of the once-autonomous duchy to Kaiser Wilhelm II, despite the existence of a formerly sovereign reigning family in that duchy, the Biron descendants of Ernst Johann von Biron. Although the German Reichstag supported national self-determination for the peoples of the Baltic provinces (what is now Latvia and Estonia), the German High Command continued the policy of attaching these territories to the German Reich by relying on the local Baltic Germans.

In October 1918, the Chancellor of Germany, Prince Maximilian of Baden, proposed to have the military administration in the Baltic replaced by civilian authority. After the German Revolution on 18 November 1918, Latvia proclaimed independence and on 7 December, the German military handed over authority to the Latvian national government headed by Kārlis Ulmanis.

Historical background 
During World War I, the German Army had occupied the Courland Governorate of the Russian Empire by the autumn of 1915. A front was established along a line stretched between Riga, Daugavpils and Baranovitch.

The Latvian Provisional National Council was proclaimed on 16 November 1917. On 30 November, the Latvian Provisional National Council proclaimed an autonomous Latvian province within ethnographic boundaries, and a formal, independent Latvian republic was declared on 15 January 1918.

After the Russian Revolution, German troops started advancing from Courland, and by the end of February 1918 the territories of the former Russian Governorate of Livonia and Autonomous Governorate of Estonia that had declared independence were also occupied and fell under the German military administration. With the Treaty of Brest-Litovsk on 3 March 1918 Bolshevist Russia accepted the loss of the Courland Governorate and by agreements concluded in Berlin on 27 August 1918 the Autonomous Governorate of Estonia and the Governorate of Livonia were severed from Russia.

As a parallel political movement under the German military administration, Baltic Germans began a process of forming provincial councils between September 1917 and March 1918. The Duchy of Courland and Semigallia was proclaimed on 8 March 1918 by one such Landesrat composed of Baltic Germans, who offered the crown of the Duchy to Kaiser Wilhelm II.

In October 1918, the Chancellor of Germany Prince Maximilian of Baden proposed to have the military administration in the Baltic replaced by civilian authority. The new policy was stated in a telegram from the German Foreign Office to the military administration of the Baltic: The government of the Reich is unanimous in respect of the fundamental change in our policy towards the Baltic lands, namely that in the first instance policy is to be made with the Baltic peoples.

On 18 November 1918, Latvia proclaimed its independence. On 7 December 1918, the German Military handed over authority to the Latvian national government headed by Kārlis Ulmanis.

Recognition 
Kaiser Wilhelm recognised the creation of Courland, as a German vassal by writing to Courland's Landesrat on March 15, 1918 (in German):

Wir Wilhelm, von Gottes Gnaden Deutscher Kaiser, König von Preußen etc. beauftragen hiermit Unseren Reichskanzler, den Grafen von Hertling, dem Kurländischen Landesrat zu erklären, daß Wir auf den Uns durch seine Vertreter übermittelten Wunsch und auf den Bericht Unseres Reichskanzlers im Namen des Deutschen Reiches das Herzogtum Kurland als freies und selbständiges Staatswesen anerkennen und bereit sind, im Namen des Deutschen Reiches diejenigen Staatsverträge mit Kurland abzuschließen, die eine enge wirtschaftliche und militärische Verbindung beider Länder gewährleisten. Gleichzeitig beauftragen Wir Unseren Reichskanzler, den Abschluß dieser Verträge vorzubereiten. Urkundlich haben Wir diesen Auftrag Allerhöchst Selbst vollzogen und mit Unserem Kaiserlichen Insiegel versehen lassen.
Gegeben ................ , den 15. März 1918
Wilhelm
Graf von Hertling.

We, Wilhelm, by the grace of God German Emperor, King of Prussia, etc., herewith command Our Chancellor, Count von Hertling, to inform the Government of Courland, that, upon the wish communicated to Us by its ambassador, and upon the report of Our Chancellor, in the name of the German Empire, We recognize the Duchy of Courland as a free and independent state; in the name of the German Empire, to negotiate such treaties with Courland as will guarantee a close economic and military relationship between both lands. At the same time, we command Our Chancellor to prepare for the negotiation of these treaties. Our Majesty has commanded that this order be documented, and affixed with Our Imperial Seal.
Given at [unknown], the 15th of March 1918
[signed] Wilhelm
Count von Hertling.

Disestablishment 
The Duchy of Courland was absorbed on September 22, 1918, by the United Baltic Duchy. Neither state, however, had any recognition other than by the German Empire.

The United Baltic Duchy was nominally recognized as a sovereign state by the Kaiser only on September 22, 1918, half a year after Soviet Russia had formally relinquished all authority over its former Imperial Baltic provinces to the German Empire in the Treaty of Brest-Litovsk. After World War I, Courland became a part of the newly formed nation of Latvia, November 18, 1918.

See also 

 Aftermath of World War I
 Duchy of Courland and Semigallia, 1562–1795.
 Courland
 Estonia
 History of Estonia
 Latvian War of Independence
 Livonia
 Ober Ost
 Semigallia
 United Baltic Duchy
 Kingdom of Poland (1916–1918)
 Kingdom of Lithuania (1918)
 Kingdom of Finland (1918)

Citations

Notes

References 

Duchy of Courland and Semigallia
Post–Russian Empire states
1918 in Latvia
States and territories established in 1918
States and territories disestablished in 1918
Former vassal states
Baltic-German people
Former client states
Former monarchies of Europe
1918 establishments in Europe
1918 disestablishments in Europe